Wilder High School is a high school in Wilder, Idaho, United States.  Located off Huff Road, the school had a total enrollment of 185 in the 2010–2011 school year, almost 80% of whom were Hispanic. There are currently 199 students enrolled in the school.

Notable alumni
Phil Batt, governor of Idaho

References

Public high schools in Idaho
Schools in Canyon County, Idaho